The Western Conference is one of two conferences in the National Hockey League (NHL) used to divide teams. Its counterpart is the Eastern Conference.

History
Originally named the Clarence Campbell Conference (or Campbell Conference for short), it was created in 1974 when the NHL realigned its teams into two conferences and four divisions. Because the new conferences and divisions had little to do with North American geography, geographical references were removed. The conferences and divisions were re-aligned in 1981 to better reflect the geographical locations of the teams, but the existing names were retained with the Campbell Conference becoming the conference for the NHL's westernmost teams.

The names of conferences and divisions were changed in 1993 to reflect their geographic locations. Then-new NHL commissioner Gary Bettman made the change to help non-hockey fans better understand the game, as the National Basketball Association, National Football League, and Major League Baseball all use geographic-based names for their conferences and divisions. However, the trophy awarded to the conference champion, the Clarence S. Campbell Bowl, retains some connection to the heritage of the league. In 2005, following the lockout, the league changed the Western Conference logo (along with the Eastern Conference and NHL logos) to its current form.

Along with the Eastern Conference, the Western Conference was temporarily abolished for the 2020–21 NHL season after the COVID-19 pandemic forced a realignment of the League to preclude the need for teams to regularly cross the Canada–United States border. For 2020–21 the four Canadian teams competed in the newly formed North Division while the five remaining Pacific Division teams from the U.S., along with three American teams from the Central Division formed a re-constituted West Division. The other three remaining Central Division teams stayed in that Division and were joined by five American teams from the Eastern Conference. These changes have been reversed, for the 2021–22 season.

Divisions
The Campbell Conference originally consisted of the Patrick Division and the Smythe Division. The 1981 realignment moved the Patrick Division to the Prince of Wales Conference and added that conference's Norris Division instead. When the names of conferences and divisions were changed in 1993, the Western Conference's divisions became the Central and Pacific. Realignment in 1998 added a third division, the Northwest.

The Northwest Division was dissolved in 2013. Its American teams joined the Central, while the Canadian teams returned to the Pacific. With this 2013 realignment, the Central Division is based almost entirely in the Central Time Zone (the only exception being the Colorado Avalanche, who are in the Mountain Time Zone), and the Pacific Division is based entirely within the Mountain and Pacific Time Zones.

On June 22, 2016, the NHL awarded Las Vegas an expansion team that began play in 2017, and thus brought the total of Western Conference teams to 15. The NHL awarded a franchise to the city of Seattle on December 4, 2018. The Seattle Kraken began playing in the 2021–22 season, increasing the Western Conference to 16 teams and the Arizona Coyotes moved to the Central Division from the Pacific Division to balance out the conference.

Champions and playoffs

The NHL's playoff system has changed over the years. Prior to 1982, the NHL had a unique playoff system compared to the NFL, NBA. and MLB. Playoff teams were seeded regardless of conference. As a result, two teams from the same conference could meet in the Stanley Cup Finals, as happened in 1977, 1978, and 1980. Under this system, the Campbell Conference champion, and therefore the winner of the Clarence S. Campbell Bowl, was the team that finished with the best regular season record in the conference.

Ever since the introduction of the Conference Finals in 1982, the Campbell Bowl has been presented to the Campbell/Western Conference playoff champions.

In the playoff system introduced in 1982, the top four teams in each division made the playoffs. The first-round winners met in the Division Finals, and the division final winners met in the conference finals. In this format, the division standings tended to be very static. In the Norris Division, for example, the Chicago Blackhawks and St. Louis Blues never missed the postseason under this format while the Minnesota North Stars only missed three times. In the Smythe Division, the Calgary Flames and the Edmonton Oilers missed the playoffs only once and the original Winnipeg Jets twice. In both cases, this usually left the other two teams to fight it out for the last playoff spot. In most years, this format resulted in the strongest teams during the regular season being forced to meet in the first or second round rather than the Conference Finals. For instance, in 1985, Winnipeg finished with the fourth-best record in the entire league, only to be forced to meet fifth-best Calgary in the first round before losing to second-best Edmonton in the division finals.

From 1994 to 2013, the top eight teams in each conference made the playoffs, with the division winners being guaranteed the top seeds (top two from 1994 to 1998, top three from 1999 to 2013) and home ice in the first round regardless of record. Unique between 1994 and 1998, a series involving a Central Division team and a Pacific Division team was a 2–3–2 rotation instead of the normal 2–2–1–1–1 format, with the higher seeded team having the option of starting play at home or on the road.

A new playoff format was introduced as part of the 2013 realignment. Under the new postseason system that was first used during the 2014 Stanley Cup playoffs, the top three teams in each division make the playoffs, with 2 wild-cards in each conference (for a total of 8 playoff teams from each conference).

References